Kangra railway station is a main railway station in Kangra district in the Indian state of Himachal Pradesh. The station lies on UNESCO World Heritage Site Kangra Valley Railway. It was allotted the railway code of KGRA under the jurisdiction of Firozpur railway division. The -wide narrow gauge was opened for traffic in 1929. In 1929 the line was regauged to -wide narrow gauge.

References

See also
 Palampur Himachal railway station
 Joginder Nagar railway station
 Jawalamukhi Road railway station
 Pathankot Junction railway station

Railway stations in Kangra district
Railway stations opened in 1929
British-era buildings in Himachal Pradesh